William Nugent (died 1690) was an Irish soldier of the seventeenth century.

An Irish Catholic, he was a Jacobite supporter of James II. The King appointed him Lord Lieutenant of County Longford. He also served as a Brigadier in the Irish Army. In February 1690 he was fatally wounded during the Battle of Cavan, a Jacobite defeat fought near the town of Cavan in southern Ulster.

References

Bibliography
 Childs, John. The Williamite Wars in Ireland. Bloomsbury Publishing, 2007.

17th-century Irish people
Irish Jacobites
Irish soldiers
Year of birth unknown
1690 deaths
Irish soldiers in the army of James II of England